Villa García Municipality is one of the 58 municipalities of the state of Zacatecas, Mexico.
It is located 140 kilometers from the city of Zacatecas.

Villa García borders the municipality of Loreto in the north, Pinos in the south east. The states of Aguascalientes in the east and Jalisco in the south.
Villa García has a population of 18,269 with an elevation of 2,100 meters above sea level.

The primary communities are Villa Garcia the administrative seat of the municipality with a population of 5,499, El Copetillo population 1,159, Aguagorda 1,042, Granadas 1,056, and Aguagordita 695.

The region holds an annual fair from December the 1st through the 12th in honor of Our Lady of Guadalupe. The municipality has a vibrant industry of sarapes which has been in decline in the last years, many locals call sarapes tapetes or forongos.

References

External links 
 - More information about Villa García(Spanish)
 - Statistics of 2010 census for Villa Garcia(Spanish/English)

Municipalities of Zacatecas